Lake Creek drains Wonder Lake and flows north-northwest  before flowing into Moose Creek in central Alaska.

References

Rivers of Denali Borough, Alaska
Rivers of Alaska